Amerozercon is a genus of mites in the family Zerconidae. There are at least four described species in Amerozercon.

Species
These four species belong to the genus Amerozercon:
 Amerozercon annularis Ujvári, 2013
 Amerozercon auricularis Ujvári, 2013
 Amerozercon halaskovae Ujvári, 2013
 Amerozercon penicillatus Ujvári, 2013

References

Zerconidae
Articles created by Qbugbot